Heng is a letter of the Latin alphabet, originating as a typographic ligature of h and ŋ. It is used for a voiceless y-like sound, such as in Dania transcription of the Danish language.

It was used word-finally in early transcriptions of Mayan languages, where it may have represented a uvular fricative.

It is sometimes used to write Judeo-Tat. 

It is also used in Bantu linguistics to indicate a voiced alveolar lateral fricative.

Transcription
A variant form, is encoded as part of the IPA Extensions Block. It is used to represent the voiceless palatal-velar fricative in the International Phonetic Alphabet.
 is used as a superscript IPA letter

Teuthonista

The Teuthonista phonetic transcription system uses .

See also
Ŋ ŋ – Latin letter Eng
Ӈ ӈ – Cyrillic letter En with hook
 Unified Northern Alphabet

References

 
 

Latin letters with diacritics
Latin-script letters
Phonetic transcription symbols